Stephen Cole Kleene (January 5, 1909 – January 25, 1994) was an American mathematician. One of the students of Alonzo Church, Kleene, along with Rózsa Péter, Alan Turing, Emil Post, and others, is best known as a founder of the branch of mathematical logic known as recursion theory, which subsequently helped to provide the foundations of theoretical computer science. Kleene's work grounds the study of computable functions. A number of mathematical concepts are named after him: Kleene hierarchy, Kleene algebra, the Kleene star (Kleene closure), Kleene's recursion theorem and the Kleene fixed-point theorem. He also invented regular expressions in 1951 to describe McCulloch-Pitts neural networks, and made significant contributions to the foundations of mathematical intuitionism.

Biography
Kleene was awarded a bachelor's degree from Amherst College in 1930. He was awarded a Ph.D. in mathematics from Princeton University in 1934, where his thesis, entitled A Theory of Positive Integers in Formal Logic, was supervised by Alonzo Church. In the 1930s, he did important work on Church's lambda calculus. In 1935, he joined the mathematics department at the University of Wisconsin–Madison, where he spent nearly all of his career. After two years as an instructor, he was appointed assistant professor in 1937.

While a visiting scholar at the Institute for Advanced Study in Princeton, 1939–1940, he laid the foundation for recursion theory, an area that would be his lifelong research interest. In 1941, he returned to Amherst College, where he spent one year as an associate professor of mathematics.

During World War II, Kleene was a lieutenant commander in the United States Navy. He was an instructor of navigation at the U.S. Naval Reserve's Midshipmen's School in New York, and then a project director at the Naval Research Laboratory in Washington, D.C.

In 1946, Kleene returned to the University of Wisconsin-Madison, becoming a full professor in 1948 and the Cyrus C. MacDuffee professor of mathematics in 1964. He served two terms as the Chair of the Department of Mathematics and one term as the Chair of the Department of Numerical Analysis (later renamed the Department of Computer Science). He also served as Dean of the College of Letters and Science in 1969–1974. During his years at the University of Wisconsin he was thesis advisor to 13 Ph.D. students. He retired from the University of Wisconsin in 1979. In 1999 the mathematics library at the University of Wisconsin was renamed in his honor.

Kleene's teaching at Wisconsin resulted in three texts in mathematical logic, Kleene (1952, 1967) and Kleene and Vesley (1965). The first two are often cited and still in print. Kleene (1952) wrote alternative proofs to the Gödel's incompleteness theorems that enhanced their canonical status and made them easier to teach and understand. Kleene and Vesley (1965) is the classic American introduction to intuitionistic logic and mathematical intuitionism.

Kleene served as president of the Association for Symbolic Logic, 1956–1958, and of the International Union of History and Philosophy of Science, 1961. The importance of Kleene's work led to Daniel Dennett coining the saying, published in 1978, that "Kleeneness is next to Gödelness." In 1990, he was awarded the National Medal of Science.

Kleene and his wife Nancy Elliott had four children. He had a lifelong devotion to the family farm in Maine. An avid mountain climber, he had a strong interest in nature and the environment, and was active in many conservation causes.

Legacy
At each conference of the Symposium on Logic in Computer Science the Kleene award, in honour of Stephen Cole Kleene, is given for the best student paper.

Selected publications
 1935. 
 1935. 
 1935. 
 1936. 
 1936. 
 1938. 
 1943. 
 1951. 
 1952. Introduction to Metamathematics. New York: Van Nostrand. (Ishi Press: 2009 reprint).
 1956. 
 1965 (with Richard Eugene Vesley). The Foundations of Intuitionistic Mathematics. North-Holland.
 1967. Mathematical Logic. John Wiley & Sons. Dover reprint, 2002. .
 1981. "Origins of Recursive Function Theory" in Annals of the History of Computing 3, No. 1.
 1987.

See also
 Kleene–Brouwer order
 Kleene–Rosser paradox
 Kleene's O
 Kleene's T predicate
 List of pioneers in computer science

Notes

References

External links
 
 Biographical memoir – by Saunders Mac Lane
 Kleene bibliography
  – Interview with Kleene and John Barkley Rosser about their experiences at Princeton
 

American computer scientists
American logicians
Amherst College alumni
Computability theorists
Educators from Hartford, Connecticut
Institute for Advanced Study visiting scholars
Intuitionism
National Medal of Science laureates
Princeton University alumni
University of Wisconsin–Madison faculty
1909 births
1994 deaths
20th-century American mathematicians
Mathematicians from Connecticut